Marguerite de Baugé (1200-1252) was also known as Marguerite de Bâgé, as Marguerite de Baujé and as the Dame de Mirabel .

Biography 
De Baugé married Humbert V, Seigneur de Beaujeu, the son of Guichard IV, Seigneur de Beaujeu. She died in March 1252 and was buried in the charterhouse of Poletins-en-Bresse.

Marguerite de Baugé's known children include Guicharde de Beaujeu, Dame Florie de Beaujeu and Belleroche-en-Beaujolais (1220 - 1248), Beatrix de Beaujeu (1222 - 1245) and Dame Isabelle de Beaujeu (1225 - 1297).

Castle of Miribel 
Marguerite de Baugé is associated with the castle of Miribel (Ain) in France. In 1180 the castle of Miribel became the property of the house of Baugé, through the marriage of the daughter of Count William with Ulric de Baugé, Lord Bresse. Marguerite was the only daughter of Gui de Bâgé and granddaughter of Ulric. She bought the castle with her dowry when she married Humbert V , sire of Beaujeu.

DNA 
Her maternal lineage traces to Pierre Terrail, seigneur de Bayard - the French national hero known as the knight "without fear and beyond reproach". De Baugé shares mtDNA haplogroup H10e with Pierre Terrail, whose remains were DNA-tested in 2017.

References 

1200 births
1252 deaths
Constables of France